Below is a list of towns and cities in Switzerland. Until 2014 municipalities with more than 10,000 inhabitants were considered to be towns. Since 2014, the Federal Statistical Office (FSO) uses a new algorithm (called , or ) to define whether a municipality can be called a town or not; it now also depends on its character. Currently, FSO considers 162 municipalities as towns/cities in Switzerland. Further, some municipalities which would fulfill such a definition nevertheless prefer to understand themselves still as a village, or consequently refer to themselves just as municipalities. The Swiss definition of a town differs from the definition of a municipality.

List of towns and cities 
This is an alphabetical list of towns or cities (these English terms can be used interchangeably, as there is no official differentiation), which follows the FSO's definition, as well as places with historic town rights (h) and/or market towns (m).

Places in bold print are towns because of the FSO's definition and historic town/market rights.
Places in italics are towns excluded by the FSO's definition, but places which have either historic town rights (h) or historic market rights (m). 
Places in normal print are towns according to the FSO's definition.
Places that had lost historic town rights previously are identified with "-h".
Cantonal capitals are underlined.

See also 

 List of municipalities of Switzerland
 List of places in Switzerland
 List of postal codes of Switzerland

Notes

References

External links

Cities
Switzerland
List
List (cities)
Switzerland